Ground Zero Man is a science fiction novel by British writer Bob Shaw, first published in 1971, and then revised as The Peace Machine in 1985.

Plot summary
The plot follows the main character, Lucas Hutchman, an "undistinguished mathematician", who invents a machine that may detonate virtually instantaneously every nuclear bomb in the world, by inducing a "self-propagating neutron resonance". Overcoming technical and personal difficulties, Hutchman manages to build the device and to warn Earth's governments of its existence, but is tracked down and prevented from using it. At the end, Hutchman realises that rather than to the elimination of nuclear weapons, his invention just led to further investments in them, to create new bombs impervious to neutron resonance.

The ending "shows precisely and prophetically . . . the flaw in [the Eighties'] plans for 'star wars' energy-beam defences"

Reception
Dave Langford reviewed The Peace Machine for White Dwarf #65, and stated that "responsibility. Its grim conclusion shows precisely and prophetically (1976, remember) the flaw in today's plans for 'star wars' energy-beam defences."

Colin Greenland reviewed The Peace Machine for Imagine magazine, and stated that "includes revisions for a more nuclear conscious audience, but it's still largely quite a traditional thriller, as compulsive and characterful as anything by Shaw."

Reviews
Review by Roger Drayne (1971) in Locus, #97 October 1, 1971
Review by Peter Nicholls (1972) in Foundation, #2 June 1972
Review by Philip Stephensen-Payne (1977) in Paperback Parlour, February 1977
Review [French] by Michel Jeury (1978) in Fiction, #293
Review by Debbie Notkin (1985) in Locus, #291 April 1985
Review by Chris Bailey (1985) in Vector 124/125
Review by Chris Morgan (1985) in Fantasy Review, April 1985
Review by Nicholas Mahoney (1987) in Paperback Inferno, #66
Review by Jack Fennell (unknown) in A Short Guide to Irish Science Fiction''

References

1971 British novels
Novels by Bob Shaw
Avon (publisher) books